Dłużec Wielki is a village in the administrative district of Gmina Korsze, within Kętrzyn County, Warmian-Masurian Voivodeship, in northern Poland.

The village has a population of 48.

References

Villages in Kętrzyn County